Chahardangeh Rural District is a rural district (dehestan) in Chahardangeh District, Sari County, Mazandaran Province, Iran. At the 2006 census, its population was 5,884, in 1,711 families. The rural district has 45 villages.

References 

Rural Districts of Mazandaran Province
Sari County